Linn Fuhrman (November 14, 1944 – January 23, 1994) was an American politician who served in the Iowa Senate from the 5th district from 1987 to 1994.

He died on January 23, 1994, in Aurelia, Iowa at age 49.

References

1944 births
1994 deaths
Republican Party Iowa state senators